Leifsonia is a Gram-positive genus of bacteria from the family Microbacteriaceae.

References

Microbacteriaceae
Bacteria genera